Delphin-Verlag was a German publishing house founded in Munich in 1911 by Richard Landauer (1882–1960).  It focused on modern art and literature, and in the 1920s also on German folklore and folk arts.  By the 1930s the Delphin-Verlag's output had slowed, and it published nothing in 1932–33.  In late 1933 Landauer moved operations to Landshut.  In 1937, the  removed Delphin-Verlag from the German Trade Register as a Jewish publisher, and in 1938 Landauer fled to London.  Delphin-Verlag was forced to close in 1945.

An unrelated publisher of children's books and nonfiction named  was founded in Cologne in 1963.

References

Works cited

Further reading

 Schier, Barbara. Der Delphin Verlag Dr. Richard Landauer. Eine Studie zur Ausschaltung eines jüdischen Verlegers im Dritten Reich. In: Hist. Kommission des Börsenvereins des Dt. Buchhandels (ed.), Buchhandelsgeschichte; 1995

Book publishing companies of Germany
Publishing companies of Germany
Publishing companies established in 1911
1945 disestablishments in Germany